Missing...Presumed Having a Good Time is a studio album by the Notting Hillbillies, released on 6 March 1990 by Vertigo Records internationally, and by Warner Bros. Records in the United States.

Critical reception

In his review for AllMusic, Tom Demalon gave the album four out of five stars, calling the album "a low-key, joyous run-through of mostly traditional, blues-based songs with a handful of originals". Demalon continued:

Demalon concluded that Missing...Presumed Having a Good Time is a "delightful record that doesn't overstay its welcome."

Track listing

The song "Lonesome Wind Blues" is a non-album track that appears on two different European/UK CD & 12" singles: "Will You Miss Me" and "Feel Like Going Home".

Personnel
Music
 Mark Knopfler – guitar, vocals
 Guy Fletcher – keyboards, vocals
 Brendan Croker – guitar, vocals
 Steve Phillips – guitar, vocals
 Paul Franklin – pedal steel guitar

 Additional musicians
 Marcus Cliffe - bass
 Ed Bicknell (Dire Straits' manager) - drums

Production
 Mark Knopfler – producer
 Guy Fletcher – producer
 Bill Schnee – mix engineer
 Brian Aris – photography
 * Ron Eve - Guitar wrangler/technician

Charts

Certifications

References

External links
 Missing...Presumed Having a Good Time at Mark Knopfler official website

1990 debut albums
Albums produced by Mark Knopfler
Albums produced by Guy Fletcher
Mark Knopfler albums
Warner Records albums